Hayley McGregory (born January 13, 1986) is an English-born American competition swimmer.  She is a former world-record holder in the 50 and 100-meter backstroke (long course), and is the first woman to break a world record held by Natalie Coughlin in the 100-meter backstroke.

Personal life

McGregory was born to British parents in London, but her family relocated to Houston, Texas when she was a young child.  She became an American citizen in 2000.  McGregory competed for the University of Texas before transferring to University of Southern California. However, she became weary of competitive collegiate swimming and dropped out of college to turn professional.  McGregory briefly trained at the North Baltimore Aquatic Club with coach Bob Bowman in early 2009. In 2011, she became the head coach at Circle C Swim Team in Austin, Texas.

Career

2000 and 2004 Olympic Trials
Hayley McGregory swam at both the 2000 and the 2004 Olympic Trials. She failed to make the team. In 2004, she finished third in both backstroke events and, therefore, did not qualify.

2008-2009
McGregory made sort of a comeback in 2008. She proved to be a huge threat to Natalie Coughlin, and broke Coughlin's world record in the 100 backstroke with a time of 59.15 in the heats at the Olympic Trials. However, Coughlin took the world record back in the next heat, with a time of 59.03. In the semifinals later that day, McGregory swam a faster time than Natalie and was the top qualifier going into the finals. However, Margaret Hoelzer beat her to second place, and she failed to make the team in the 100 meter backstroke, as well as the 200 meter backstroke later in the meet, finishing in third place in both races just like in 2004.

At the 2009 USA National Championships, McGregory made the World Championship team in the 50 meter and 100 meter backstroke. The 2009 World Aquatics Championships was the first international meet of her career. In the 50 meter backstroke, she failed to make it past the semifinals. She finished in eleventh place with a time of 27.83, 0.03 seconds away from her American record. She did, however, make it to the finals of the 100 meter backstroke. However, she ended up getting sixth place in the finals, and the US women failed to advance past the prelims of the women's 4x100 medley relay, therefore ending her chances of winning a medal. McGregory swam at the 2009 Mutual of Omaha Duel in the Pool and competed in the women's 100 m Backstroke (25m) and got last in the event with a time of 58.54, and there McGregory's professional career came to an end.

Personal bests

Long Course

See also
 List of University of Texas at Austin alumni
 World record progression 50 metres backstroke
 World record progression 100 metres backstroke

References

External links
 
 
 USC athlete bio: Hayley McGregory
 Arluck Promotions athlete bio: Hayley McGregory

1986 births
Living people
American female swimmers
American female backstroke swimmers
Texas Longhorns women's swimmers
USC Trojans women's swimmers
World record setters in swimming
Universiade medalists in swimming
Universiade gold medalists for the United States
Medalists at the 2005 Summer Universiade